Kahntah Aerodrome  was an aerodrome located  south of Kahntah, British Columbia, Canada.

References

Defunct airports in British Columbia
Northern Rockies Regional Municipality